Abhayachandra Jain is an Indian Politician from the state of Karnataka. He was a member of the Karnataka Legislative Assembly representing the Moodabidri constituency. He is the honourable president of excellent PU college Moodbidri.

Political party
He is from the Indian National Congress.

Ministry
He was the Minister for Fisheries, Youth Services & Sports in the K. Siddaramaiah led Karnataka Government.

References 

µ
Living people
Karnataka MLAs 2013–2018
Indian National Congress politicians from Karnataka
Year of birth missing (living people)
Place of birth missing (living people)